Paul Oronhyatekha Jacobs (February 23, 1893 – May 1, 1973) was a Canadian professional ice hockey and lacrosse player. Jacobs played one game in the National Hockey League (NHL) for the Toronto Arenas during the  1918–19 NHL season. Jacobs may have been the first aboriginal ice hockey player in the NHL.

Playing career

Jacobs was a resident of  the Kahnawake Mohawk Territory, south of Montreal. Jacobs was proficient as a youth playing lacrosse. Photographs exist of Jacobs as a member of the reserve lacrosse team in 1910.

Jacobs was also proficient at ice hockey. He is first recorded on a hockey team with Dominion Bridge Company team in the 1912–13 season. Records exist for Jacobs playing for various teams from 1912 through 1916 and from 1917 through 1925, the last recorded team being the amateur Cleveland Ohio Blues of the USAHA.

Jacobs' record in the NHL is unclear. Jacobs was invited to the Toronto Arenas' training camp in December 1918. Jacobs potentially earned an opening-day roster spot but an announcement in the Toronto Globe indicated he was returning to the Montreal area instead. Jacobs played several games for the Montreal Stars of the Montreal Hockey League that season. Jacobs is recorded in referee reports for five games for Toronto between December 31 and February 4. However no newspaper reports list Jacobs as being in the lineup for any of those games. He may have been a substitute and did not play. Jacobs is recorded in an Ottawa paper for the opening-day December 23 game, but no other newspaper included Jacobs in the game report. An NHL report for the season records Jacobs as only participating in the December 31 game.

US census records for 1930 and 1940 list Jacobs as living in Detroit with his wife Alice.

Career statistics

Regular season and playoffs

Transactions
 Signed as a free agent by the Toronto Arenas, December 15, 1918.

See also
List of players who played only one game in the NHL

References

External links

1893 births
1973 deaths
Anglophone Quebec people
Canadian ice hockey defencemen
Canadian lacrosse players
Ice hockey people from Montreal
Toronto Arenas players